Operación Triunfo is a Spanish reality television music competition to find new singing talent. The seventh series, also known as Operación Triunfo 2009, aired on Telecinco from 29 April 2009 to 21 July 2009, presented by Jesús Vázquez.

Mario Álvarez was the winner of the series.

Auditions
Open casting auditions were held in a number of locations:
Oviedo: NH Principado – 10 March 2009
Las Palmas (Las Palmas de Gran Canaria): NH Imperial Playa – 11 March 2009
Barcelona: Teatro Tívoli – 16 March 2009
Palma, Majorca: Melia Palas Atenea – 18 March 2009
Málaga: Hotel NH Málaga – 19 March 2009
Santiago de Compostela: Hotel Hesperia Peregrino – 24 March 2009
Bilbao: Teatro Ayala – 26 March 2009
Valencia: Teatro Olympia – 30 March 2009
Seville: Teatro Central – 3 April 2009
Madrid: Teatro Lope de Vega – 6 April 2009
There were also casting based on online presentations by contestants who couldn't attend any of the above sessions

Headmaster, judges and presenter
Headmaster: Àngel Llàcer
Judges: Noemí Galera, Risto Mejide, Ramoncín and Coco Comín
Presenter: Jesús Vázquez

Contestants

Galas

Results summary
Colour key

External links
Operación Triunfo on Telecinco site

Operación Triunfo
2009 Spanish television seasons